= John Grosett =

English politician (died 1866)

John Rock Grosett (c. 1784 – September 1866) was an British soldier and politician. He sat as MP for Chippenham from 1820 till 1826.

== Political career ==
He served as cornet of the 13th Dragoon in 1804 and was promoted to lieutenant in 1805, he retired in 1807; he served as member of assembly in Jamaica from 1831 till 1844; and member of council.

== Family ==
He was the second but only surviving son of the merchant Schaw Grosett (died 1820) and Mary, the daughter of Thomas Rock, a Bristol merchant. On 19 February 1810, he married his first cousin Mary Spencer (died 31 October 1820), the daughter of Edward Shirley and they had at least four sons (three predeceased him) and at least two daughters (whom predeceased him). On 20 July 1825, he married Christina Maria de Kantzow and they had at least one son whom predeceased him.
